Rex George Keeling Jr. (September 9, 1943 – June 3, 2010) was an American football punter in the National Football League (NFL) who played for the Cincinnati Bengals. He played college football at Samford University.

References 

1943 births
2010 deaths
American football punters
Players of American football from Dallas
Samford Bulldogs football players
Cincinnati Bengals players